The Swiss football club FC Basel began their 2010–11 season with various warm-up matches against Swiss lower league, Ukrainian Vyscha Liha, and Ligue 1 clubs. The aims for the team during the 2010–11 season were to take back the league and cup titles as well as to qualify for the UEFA Champions League.

Overview 
German Thorsten Fink remained head-coach for the second consecutive season. He brought four youngsters up from the U-21 team, being Matthias Baron, Janick Kamber and the brothers Taulant and Granit Xhaka. Further transfers into the team were Gilles Yapi who came from BSC Young Boys on a free transfer, Genséric Kusunga who also came in on a free transfer from Servette FC and Fwayo Tembo who was bought in from Étoile du Sahel. Yann Sommer also rejoined the team after being on loan to Grasshopper Club Zürich. During the winter break Aleksandar Dragović transferred in from Austria Wien. 

In the other direction Marcos Gelabert transferred out to Neuchâtel Xamax, Stefan Wessels moved on to FK Ventspils, Serkan Sahin to Konyaspor, Carlitos to Malaga and Antonio da Silva’s loan came to an end and he returned to Karlsruher SC.

The Campaign

Domestic League
The format of the 2010–11 Swiss Super League season remained as it had been since the 2003–04 season, divided into two halves, autumn and spring, each half played in a double round robin. Basel entered the season as the reigning champions, having edged the Young Boys out on the final day of the last season. The club’s clear aim for the team in the league was to retain the title.

FCB began the season on 20 July with a home game against FC Zurich, which was won 3–2. The team won their first three games, but in the fourth round suffered an unforeseen 0–1 away defeat against Bellinzona. In the following round Basel suffered an embarrassing 1–4 home defeat against Luzern, which let the team slip to a midfield position in the league table. In the following nine rounds the team remained undefeated, but with five draws in these nine games Basel were well away from being league leaders. What then followed was another embarrassing 1–3 home defeat against Thun. The first half of the domestic season ended on 12 December as Basel travelled to Zurich to face Grasshopper in the away game at the Letzigrund. This game ended with a 1–2 defeat and this left the club with that midfield slot in the table. The triple burden of league, cup and Champions League group stage had taken its toll.

After the winter break, the second half of the season began on 6 February 2011 with a 3–2 revenging away win against Thun. This was the start to Basel’s best phase of the season, during which they advanced to become league leaders with eight consecutive victories and one draw. During the entire second half of the season the team suffered only one defeat, this being the match in the 31st round away against FC Sion, but this defeat meant that they slipped back to second position in the table. In round 33, ten days later, Basel achieved a 2–2 away draw, after twice being a goal behind, against their direct competitors for the title FC Zürich, both were then level on 66 points. Then Zürich lost the derby against Grasshopper Club and because Basel drew against St. Gallen, they moved one point clear at the top. Subsequently on the final match day, on 25 May, Basel’s victory against Luzern secured them the championship for the second time in succession.

The team achieved their aim by winning the championship. Alexander Frei was top goal scorer for the club and in the league with 27 goals. Second top goal scorer in the league was Henri Bienvenu from the Young Boys with 16 goals. Marco Streller was the team’s second top scorer with ten goals, third was Valentin Stocker with seven goals. Frei achieved his personal aim in winning the top-scorer title.

Domestic Cup
Basel entered the 2010–11 Swiss Cup in the first round of the competition and the team's clear aim was to defend the title having won the 2009–10 Swiss Cup. In the first round, teams from the Super League and Challenge League were seeded and could not play against each other. In a match, the home advantage was granted to the team from the lower league, if applicable.

Mendrisio-Stabio (19 September 2010)
In the first round Basel were drawn against FC Mendrisio-Stabio, who at that time played in the 1. Liga, the third tier of Swiss football. The match was played in the Campo comunale Mendrisio with an attendance of 3,200 spectators. Head coach Thorsten Fink had mixed a number of their youngsters into the team, but nevertheless they dominated their opponents, although they were able to hold on for half an hour before the inevitable occurred. In the 31st minute Federico Almerares was able to put the visitors into the lead. Six minutes later Pascal Schürpf doubled the Basel lead and that was the score at half time. In the 64st minute Fwayo Tembo added a third, nine minutes later Schürpf added his second and two minutes from time Almerares also hit his second as well.

Yverdon-Sports (15 October 2010)
In the second round of the Cup the teams from the Super League were seeded and could not play each other. In the matches the home advantage was granted to the team from the lower league, if applicable. Basel were drawn against Yverdon-Sports, who at that time played in the 1. Liga, the third tier of Swiss football. The game was played in the Stade Municipal in Yverdon-les-Bains. Again, head coach Thorsten Fink played with a B-team, the goalie Franco Costanzo travelled with the team as substitute, but the players Alexander Frei, Behrang Safari, Valentin Stocker, Marco Streller, Daniel Unal, Granit Xhaka were all given a day off und Jacques Zoua was injured. There were six youngsters in the team, of whick Taulant Xhaka played his very first game in the starting eleven. Basel started slow and needed 25 minutes before they created their first good chance. Basel played better, but Yverdon held on with their players showing their fighting spirits. On 72 minutes the dead-lock was broken, Reto Zanni crossed from the right, Fwayo Tembo lengthened it and the ball dropped to Federico Almerares’ feet and he made no mistake. Five minutes later a free kick on the left was played shot from Almerares to Xherdan Shaqiri, his cross was met by Tembo who scored from close distance. Basel won 2–0 and advanced to the next round.

Servette (20 November 2010)
In the third round, the ties were drawn, there was no seeding, everyone could meet everyone. The home advantage was granted to the team from the lower league, otherwise to the team that was drawn first. Basel were drawn at away against Servette, who at that time played in the Challenge League, the second tier of Swiss football. The game was played in the Stade de Genève with an attendance of 14,150 spectators. Basel were without captain and goalie Franco Costanzo and defender Behrang Safari, both were given a day off, without midfielder Gilles Yapi, who was suspended (due to 5 yellow cards) and without Genséric Kusunga and Marco Streller, both injured. Other top players such as Alexander Frei and Benjamin Huggel were on the bench. Servette started well and they had the first chance but the long-distance free kick was well held by reserve goalie Yann Sommer. On 18 minutes Servette had the ball in their own defensive area, but they played an indecisive pass too many, Federico Almerares rushed between man and ball and was fouled. Scott Chipperfield put the subsequent spot-kick home sending goalie David González in the wrong direction. Basel controlled the rest of the first period, but created only few good chances. However, after the interval Servette took over control and with the first long cross into the box an attacker fell and referee Massimo Busacca decided on penalty here as well. Sommer was left without a chance and things were level again. Federico Almerares had a chance that hit the post, but not many other moves were dangerous. The 1–1 score remained after 90 minutes and also after extra time. Therefore, a penalty shoot-out had to bring the decision. Basel won the shoot-out 4–3 and advanced to the next round.

Biel-Bienne ( 3 March 2011)
The winners of Round 3 played in the quarterfinals. The games were played on 2 and 3 March 2011 and Basel were drawn away against FC Biel-Bienne, who at that time played in the Challenge League, the second tier of Swiss football. The game was played in the Gurzelen Stadion with a sold-out attendance of 6,500 on the day. Basel played with their B-team, head coach Thorsten Fink changed ten positions in the starting eleven, Gilles Yapi was the only remaining player compared to the previous championship game. Nevertheless, Basel were favourites and Biel the underdogs. Basel started the game better and in the early stages played concentrated forwards. They came to their first chance, but Scott Chipperfield failed to get contact to the cross, only a couple of inches were missing. Two minutes before the interval a long free kick from Granit Xhaka was deflected into the goal, unluckily, by Biel-Bienne defender Nicolas Kehrli. The Biel-Bienne team came out of the break highly motivated, but they missed their first chance as the ball went over the bar. Two minutes later Ramon Egli equalised for the underdogs, he lifted the ball over the onrushing goalie Yann Sommer and the teams were level. From then onwards, nothing seemed to be prolific for the favourites, they missed their chances. Both teams had their opportunities, but only the home team were able to take advantage. There was a corner for the home team and it was played long, then a cross from the other side and Giuseppe Morello put the home team a goal up. Basel coach reacted immediately, he brought his best forwards Alexander Frei and Marco Streller from the substitutes bench. But following a free-kick out of the Basel defence area, they could only watch the next counter-attack. Pietro Di Nardo trapped the poorly kicked ball and played forwards to Etoundi, who gave the hosts a surprising 3–1 lead and victory. This because the final attack was also from the home team, Egli’s shot, however, rebounded from the cross bar.

Conclusion
The club's clear aim had been to defend the title, having won it during the previous season. The embarrassing defeat against a lower classed team was a big disappointment. The team had missed the aim entirely and this increased the pressure on the team in the aim of defending their championship title. 

Xamax and Sion advanced to the final, which was played in Basel’s St. Jakob-Park. Sion achieved their overall 12th cup title and were thus qualified for the play-off round of next season’s UEFA Europa League.

Champions League 
As Swiss Champions Basel entered the 2010–11 UEFA Champions League in the [2010–11 UEFA Champions League qualifying phase and play-off round#Third qualifying round|third qualifying round]. Basel's clear aim for this competition was to reach the group stage and, if possible, to advance to the knock-out stage, which was to start after the winter break. Basel were top seeded based on their 2010 UEFA club coefficients in the Champions Path and were drawn against the Hungarian champions Debrecen.

Third qualifying round
Debreceni VSC (28 July 2010)
Basel played the first match away from home, it was played in Budapest at Szusza Ferenc Stadium as Debrecen's Stadion Oláh Gábor Út did not meet UEFA criteria. It was a clear night, the pitch was dry and the match played in front of a crowd of 5,000 people. Both sides started well and created good opportunities in the opening stages of the match. Adamo Coulibaly had a good volley, but goalkeeper Franco Costanzo was able to save it. Then Alexander Frei nodded a right-wing cross from Samuel Inkoom just wide of the far post. Then Coulibaly played a neat ball to Péter Czvitkovics, but he drove his shot from ten metres against his team-mate. Xherdan Shaqiri had the best chances, but his header from close range went straight at Debrecen goalkeeper István Verpecz. In the 34th minute Jacques Zoua set up Valentin Stocker, who slammed his left-footed shot into the bottom corner of the goal. Both Shaqiri (60) and Stocker (69) had further good chances but failed to add the next goal to the scoresheet. In the later stages as József Varga danced between the Basel defenders but his shot was too weak and Costanzo held with ease. In the 88th minute, Basel head coach Thorsten Fink replaced Stocker and substituted in Granit Xhaka who had been brought up from the youth team only two months earlier. In the third minute of added time, he saw his chance and tried his luck from 25 metres out and indeed the teenage substitute was rewarded with a goal to remember and complete the 2–0 victory.

Return match (4 August 2010)
The second leg of this fixture was played in the St. Jakob-Park a week later on 4 August. The weather was warm and dry, the pitch was dry and the match was played in front of 17,376 spectators. Basel took control of the game early. In the ninth minute, from just five metres out, Scott Chipperfield headed his first chance to the wrong side of the goal-post. But Basel needed just 26 minutes before they vanquished any hopes of a Debrecen comeback in the return leg. Defender Çağdaş Atan scored the first goal of the match as Benjamin Huggel's header rebounded off the crossbar and Çağdaş was positioned in the right place at the right time and was ready to put the ball into the net. Despite the fact that Jacques Zoua also struck the woodwork seven minutes later, it was only a matter of time before the next goal came. In the second half Chipperfield added the second in the 59th minute. Huggel was again the player that gave the assist, flicking on a cross for Chipperfield to leap in front of goalkeeper István Verpecz and turn the ball in. Xherdan Shaqiri then added the third in the 64th minute, having outplayed the Debrecen defence. Adamo Coulibaly's goal 16 minutes from time, on rebound after Franco Costanzo had saved his penalty, was only a small consolation, because Basel had already decided the tie for themselves and knocking the Hungarian titleholders out of the competition 3–1 on the day and 5–1 on aggregate.

Play-off round
In the [2010–11 UEFA Champions League qualifying phase and play-off round#Play-off round|play-off round] Basel were again top seeded. Here they were drawn against the Moldovan champions, FC Sheriff Tiraspol. The winning side would enter into the 2010–11 Champions League Group Stage while the defeated side would enter into the 2010–11 Europa League Group Stage.

Sheriff Tiraspol (18 August 2010)
The first leg was played at home in the St. Jakob-Park in front of 13,640 spectators against Sheriff Tiraspol. Due to the rainy evening the pitch was described as wet. Referee was Terje Hauge from the Football Association of Norway. Both teams started well, but it soon showed that Basel were better. After 11 minutes it seemed that Alexander Frei had given his team the lead as he took on Behrang Safari's cross and applied a neat finish, but he was offside. Minutes later at the other end Vladimir Volkov shot flew wide of the goal, but these were rare attacking moments in the first half. It was not until the stroke of half-time that Frei, with a curling free-kick, forced keeper Vladislav Stoyanov to make his first real save. At the start of the second period Florent Rouamba had a good effort but home goalkeeper Franco Costanzo was ready. Basel responded to this with their best spell of the match. Only a timely tackle could stop Jacques Zoua from taking his chance in front of goal after a good cross from Xherdan Shaqiri. A corner from Frei was met well by Benjamin Huggel but he headed the ball onto the post. In the 54th minute Valentin Stocker was left unmarked and he headed the ball into the net after a looping cross from Shaqiri. Immediately the Moldovan champions tried to level things out. Sheriff were now on top, but first Basel captain and goalie Costanzo denied Wilfried Balima and then substitute Marko Đurović twice headed over from close range and later had a shot that hit the post. Basel caught themselves and fought back into the game. Aleksandr Yerokhin received a second booking for dissent and was sent off. Following this keeper Stoyanov brought down Basel’s substitute Federico Almerares but he made amends by diving low to save Huggel's penalty. The game ended with the 1–0 win for the home side.

Return match (24 August 2010)
The second leg of this fixture was played in Sheriff Stadium in Tiraspol with 12,000 supports watching on this clear and warm evening. Referee was Martin Hansson from the Sweden and the pitch was declared as dry. Alexander Frei scored twice and gave the assist to the other as FC Basel won the match 3–0, and 4–0 on aggregate, to qualify for the group stage. One goal up following the first leg, Marco Streller doubled Basel's aggregate lead in the 74th minute, heading home a Frei free-kick that came in from the left. Soon after that Sheriff captain Vazha Tarkhnishvili received a second booking and was dismissed. Frei, with two late efforts, then sealed his team’s comfortable victory and the passage to the group stage, sending Sheriff into the UEFA Europa League.

Group stage
The draw for the group stage was held in Monaco on 26 August 2010. Teams were seeded into four pots based on their 2010 UEFA club coefficients. Basel were seeded into the third pot. And they were drawn into Group E together with Bayern Munich, Roma and CFR Cluj.

CFR Cluj (15 September 2010)
Matchday 1 for Basel was played in the stadium Dr. Constantin Rădulescu in Cluj-Napoca which had a crowd of 9,395. Referee was Alan Kelly from the Football Association of Ireland. Cluj started fast and furious into the game and Basel never quite recovered after Juan Culio set up goals for Ionuţ Rada and Lacina Traoré inside the opening 12 minutes. Cluj head-coach Sorin Cârţu had only been appointed into his position at the beginning of the week and this was the perfect start to his new job. The victory owed everything to the hosts opening few minutes and to Argentinian midfielder Culio, who proved his qualities in giving two fine left-footed assists during this time. His first assist came from a set piece, a corner, and the second was out of open play down the right. The beneficiaries were Rada, from the corner, in the ninth minute, and Traoré, following a cross in the 12th, both of whom hit strong headers beyond Basel captain and keeper Franco Costanzo. Basel, who had started as favourites, only recovered their composure slowly. It was in the added time before the break that Valentin Stocker with a header at the near post following a corner kick from Alexander Frei. This lifted Basel’s spirits and gave Thorsten Fink's men something to play for during the second half. Indeed, the visitors could have claimed a point, Xherdan Shaqiri volleyed over bar and on 77 minutes goalkeeper Nuno Claro did well to tip the ball over as Scott Chipperfield sent a powerful header towards the goal. However, the score 2–1 remained until the final whistle and this was considered as a disappointing result by the visitors.

Bayern Munich (28 September 2010)
Bayern Munich were the visiting team on matchday two in the St. Jakob-Park in front of a sold out 37.500 crowd. Referee was Craig Thomson from the Scottish Football Association on this cloudy, but cool evening. Both teams started quickly and well into the match and were looking for the early goal. Bayern took control of the game as it settled. The first chance came from Toni Kroos, but his low strike was excellently saved one-handed by Basel goalkeeper and captain Franco Costanzo. Bayern continually increased the pressure, but Daniel Van Buyten shot over the bar shortly afterwards. Then, after 18 minutes, the evening took an unexpected change of course as Basel's two attackers combined well to score the first goal. Marco Streller raced into the penalty area, he then out-tricked defender Van Buyten back heeling to Alexander Frei who curled his shot past the helpless Jörg Butt. After this Bayern grappled to find a response and Basel’s confidence grew. Xherdan Shaqiri took a fierce drive, but this was parried by Butt. The closest that the visitors came before the interval was a long distance shot from captain Mark van Bommel. After the break Bayern improved and as Benjamin Huggel brought Thomas Müller to fall in the box, Bastian Schweinsteiger coolly sank the penalty kick to level things out. Coach Louis van Gaal then attempted to strengthen the Bayern attack and brought on Mario Gómez and Ivica Olić, but neither managed to finish off a good cross from Philipp Lahm on 68 minutes. With a quick reaction, Butt was able to deny Streller with his effort and then Gilles Yapi went close with a good shot. Moving into the latter stages it was the visitors who looked more likely to snatch victory. But both Müller and Olić sent their chances over the top. Then one minute from time Schweinsteiger converted a Danijel Pranjić free-kick to turn tables and give Bayern the 2 – 1 victory and all three points.

Roma (19 October 2010)
Referee Aleksey Nikolaev from the Russian Football Union was in charge of the game in the Stadio Olimpico on matchday three between Roma and Basel. A crowd of 22,365 saw the visitors take the lead on 12 minutes and this thanks to a fine team move that began deep back in their own half of the field. Gilles Yapi played the ball diagonally wide to Xherdan Shaqiri, his cross from the right was controlled by Marco Streller and his cushioned header back into the centre was met by Alexander Frei who fired home from 14 metres. The hosts then controlled the activities and had most of the possession. Marco Borriello fired his first shot over the goal, but he didn’t have to wait long for his next chance. Francesco Totti showed skill and vision and played a long pass from deep within his own half beyond the entire defence. Borriello kept cool and drew Basel keeper Franco Costanzo out, then chipped the ball beyond him into the goal to level things out. Roma continued their good work. Totti was unlucky twice not to score. On 37 minutes, he beat Yapi and moved inwards, but shot just wide of the far post with his left foot and, following the restart, another long-distance shot flew narrowly wide of goal. However, by this time Basel had reclaimed the lead. In the 44th minute Samuel Inkoom had been far too quick for Simone Perrotta and he controlled Xherdan Shaqiri's clever angled pass to hit an unstoppable low effort past the helpless Bogdan Lobonț. After the interval Roma stepped up the tempo of their game, and forced the visitors back into their own half most of the time, as they strived for an equaliser. Both sides missed presentable headed opportunities. Benjamin Huggel nodding centimetres wide and Roma duo Matteo Brighi and Philippe Mexès also headed over. With one minute to go a Totti' free-kick was well saved by Costanzo and his clearance flew to Cabral, who sneaked though at the other end to score the final goal in Basel’s 3–1 win.

Roma (3 November 2010)
Matchday four was the return game of that played a fortnight before. Basel hosted Roma in the St. Jakob-Park with a sold-out attendance of 36,375 spectators. The two teams were level in the group on three points, but straight away both sides pressed forwards looking for an early lead. Jérémy Ménez had the first chance, but from a tight angle his shot scraped the cross bar and went over. Then at the other end keeper Júlio Sérgio bravely dived in to deny Benjamin Huggel. The hosts were looking better and more dangerous and so it was against the run of play as the visitors took the lead on 16 minutes. Samuel Inkoom did well to stop Mirko Vučinić before he could fire off his shot, but the entire defence was helpless as Ménez pushed home the loose ball. The visitors were then able to double their lead with 25 minutes gone. Valentin Stocker pulled down John Arne Riise as he entered the box, this enabled Francesco Totti to score with the spot-kick. It took until midway through the second period before the Basel’s attacking moves became threatening. First, Gilles Yapi sent a dipping volley narrowly over the top. Then David Abraham marched forward from his centre-back position, but he blasted his powerful shot just wide. Eventually Basel's attacking efforts were rewarded on 69 minutes. Stocker sent in a left-wing cross and this was deflected beyond Sérgio, allowing Alexander Frei to nod the ball into the unguarded goal. Shortly afterwards Basel again pressed forward, but Marco Streller's shot flew against the post. Again, it was against the run of play as in the 76th minute substitute Leandro Greco smashed home Roma's third goal. Nevertheless, Basel pushed forward and Xherdan Shaqiri's late goal for Basel on 83 minutes set up the tense final phase. Ultimately Roma held on for the crucial three points, winning 3–2 and climbed in the table to second position. To make things worse for Basel, during the added time Stocker was shown a second yellow card by referee Björn Kuipers and was therefore dismissed.

Cluj (23 November 2010)
Visitors to the St. Jakob-Park, with an attendance of 34,239 spectators, on matchday five was CFR Cluj and referee on this damp and cold evening was Laurent Duhamel from the French Football Federation. In the early stages the play was slow, the nervousness was evident, because both sides were aware that only a win would guarantee their survival in the competition. Xherdan Shaqiri had the first two chances and both were long range shots. At the other end Emmanuel Culio mis controlled the ball after a good pass by Léo Veloso into the centre. With 15 minutes gone Samuel Inkoom set Federico Almerares free with a fine low ball into the box to which the Argentinian striker applied a sliding finish. Following this, the home side almost managed a second goal, but Alexander Frei's shot was cleared off the line by Felice Piccolo. The hosts had another threatening chance as Behrang Safari's double effort was blocked first by Tony and then by captain Cadú on the line. Up front CFR's struggled to create chances and this struggling continued into the second half. It wasn’t until the 60th minute  until the next chance was created. Again, it came from the Basel, but Fwayo Tembo's shot was deflected onto the cross-bar by goalkeeper Nuno Claro’s outstretched leg. On 73 minutes Alexander Frei netted the ball with a close-range finish. Basel celebrated because they thought that he had put the game beyond doubt, but the goal was ruled out for offside. In the finishing stages the Basel defence had little to worry about, CRF attacking moves were definitely not dangerous and after Piccolo was given a straight red two minutes from time, they were non-existent. With the 1–0 victory Basel were guaranteed at least third spot, which would see them advance to the Europa League knockout phase. CFR were eliminated.

Bayern Munich (8 December 2010)
Matchday six for Basel was played at the Allianz Arena as visitors to German champions Bayern Munich. Referee was Martin Hansson from the Swedish Football Association. Despite the evening being cloudy and cold, the match had an attendance of 64,000. The requirements were clear, FCB needed to win and AS Roma had to lose in order for Basel to progress, on the other hand Bayern had already secured the top spot in the group. Basel started well and fast. A long ball from Marco Streller sent Xherdan Shaqiri rushing behind the back four to deliver a cross for Alexander Frei, who shot the ball fiercely across the goal mouth, but goalkeeper Thomas Kraft parried superbly. The early Basel rush subsided and Bayern played forward. First Philipp Lahm played a good cross, then Thomas Müller a cross from the other side, before a Toni Kroos corner was somehow missed by three Bayern players stood within short distance of Franco Costanzo's goal. Basel remained dangerous with their counterattacks and Kraft reacted well twice as both Frei and Streller had good chances. Bayern brought the game under their control. Diego Contento snatched the ball from Cabral and set up Franck Ribéry to score the opener. Two minutes later Mario Gómez lengthened a Toni Kroos corner and this enabled Anatoliy Tymoshchuk to stab home the second from close range. Basel play stunned completely after this double burst and their moves did not improve after the break either. In the 49th minute Müller burst forward, played a quick through ball to Ribéry, which left him only to side-foot beyond keeper Franco Costanzo. The game was decided at this point and it lost on footballing quality. Bayern with another chance and only a brilliant reflex stop at point-blank range from Costanzo denied Bastian Schweinsteiger from adding a fourth. Basel substitute Federico Almerares wasted an excellent chance to pull one back. Late in the game only Costanzo's alertness prevented first Mark van Bommel and then Gomez from adding to the visitors suffering. The score remained at 3–0 and for Bayern this was their seventh successive home win in European competition.

Europa League 
The knockout phase of the 2010–11 UEFA Europa League began on 15 February 2011. The draw was held at UEFA headquarters in Nyon on 17 December 2010.

Knockout phase
It involved 32 teams: the 24 teams that finished in the top two in each group in the group stage and the eight teams that finished in third place in the UEFA Champions League group stage. Basel were unseeded and were drawn, with the first leg at home, against Spartak Moscow, who as Russian Premier League vice-champions had also dropped from the Champions League.

Spartak Moscow (15 February 2011)
The match at the St. Jakob-Park with an attendance of 13,073 people was held on a cloudy and cold evening with the temperature at freezing point. Aleksandar Stavrev of the Football Federation of Macedonia was the referee and the pitch was reported as being soft. Both teams started well and shared equal possession of play. Alexander Frei broke the deadlock on 36 minutes. After a Xherdan Shaqiri corner was directed on towards Frei at the near post he headed the ball beyond the reach of Spartak’s goalkeeper Andriy Dykan. Five minutes later Marco Streller headed in another Shaqiri corner, Dykan had misjudged its flight and it stood 2-0. After the break Spartak pressed forward constantly. On 61 minutes captain Alex battled forward to the edge of the box and took aim, but his shot was blocked and fell into the path of Dmitri Kombarov, who smashed the ball in via keeper Franco Costanzo’s left-hand post. Just ten minutes later the scores were levelled as Artyom Dzyuba controlled the ball with his thigh and punted it home.  On 78 minutes Shaqiri saw a direct red for his violent behaviour and from then Basel just attempted to hold on. But two minutes into added time captain Alex was presented with a free-kick just outside the penalty area. Instead of shooting, he pushed the ball across to Jano Ananidze and his low drive passed the wall and bounced into the target off Costanzo’s right-hand post. Spartak had taken a significant step towards the next round after recovering from being two down to secure an unlikely 3–2 victory.

Return match (24 February 2011)
The second leg in the Luzhniki Stadium took place one week later. Referee was Cristian Balaj of the Romanian Football Federation and the pitch was reported as dry. The match had an attendance of 14,977 spectators, despite the cold temperature of minus 14 degrees. Trailing 3–2 following their last-minute defeat in the first leg, the requirements for Swiss champions were clear, they had to score at least two goals to have any chance of advancing to the next round. But it was Spartak Moscow that started better. Their mobile attacking trio Dmitri Kombarov, Aiden McGeady and Artem Dzyuba caused early problems for the visitors’ defence with their speedy runs up front. On 15 minutes, however, it was the visitors who opened the score. Spartak keeper Andriy Dykan attempted to punch away a left-wing cross, but this fell to the feet of Scott Chipperfield. The Australian international was left to complete the simplest of things and he was able to side-foot the ball into an unguarded net. This put his team on their way in the early stages of the first half, but many good chances were not created. In the second-half, irrespective of the fact that they had plenty of ball possession, the visitors could rarely test the Spartak goalie. Despite Basel’s head coach Thorsten Fink bringing on substitute Alexander Frei, who pushed a late chance wide of the goal, Basel rarely looked like finding their vital second goal. Spartak forward McGeady finally put the result beyond doubt with his added-time equaliser tapping the ball into the net after Dzyuba had rounded goalkeeper Franco Costanzo. Spartak advanced to the round of 16 in the Europa League following their 1–1 home draw which gave them a 4–3 aggregate victory over Basel.

Conclusion
From the Basel group, Group E, Bayern Munich and Roma advanced to the knock-out phase, but both were knocked out in the next round. Barcelona and Manchester United advanced to the final, which the Spaniards won 3–1. From Basel’s point of few they reached the aim by reaching the group stage. The second aim was, if possible, to advance to the knock-out stage. They did not reach the knock-out stage of the Champions League but did reach the knock-out round of the Europa League. In the Europa League the final was played between Porto and Braga and Porto won the title with a 1–0 win. Therefore, for the club this was indeed a very pleasing result.

Club

FC Basel Holding AG
The FC Basel Holding AG (Holding) owns 75% of the club FC Basel (FC Basel 1893 AG) and the other 25% is owned by the club members. Chairwoman of the Holding was Gisela Oeri. She owned 91.96% of the shares. The other 8,04% of the shares were owned by a group of investors, these being Manor AG, J. Safra Sarasin, Novasearch AG, MCH Group AG and Weitnauer Holding AG. As chairwoman of the holding Ms Oeri was also chairwoman of the club.

Club management
The club's board of directors remained in the same constellation as in the previous season.

One of the most important occurrences during the year 2010 was the formation of the Nachwuchs Campus Basel, to English foundation Youth Campus Basel. This was founded by then FCB chairwoman Gigi Oeri with the aim of promoting youth football in Basel on a sustainable basis. The purpose of the foundation is the integral training and promotion of young football talents in football, schooling, education and personality. The first managing director of the foundation was Benno Kaiser and he was also in the club's board of directors. Since its formation, the foundation owns the accommodation centre which provides space for youth players and offers them supervised accommodation and nutrition. The foundation was to aid in the administration of the club's youth department. The foundation was to build, later to run and maintain the campus grounds.

Team management
The German Thorsten Fink remained head-coach for the second consecutive season. His team also remained in the same constellation as in the previous season.

Kit

|
|

First team
The following is the list of the Basel first team squad. It also includes players that were in the squad the day the season started on 20 July 2010 but subsequently left the club after that date. 

As of 23 July 2010

Multiple Nationality
 1    Franco Costanzo
 11   Scott Chipperfield
 15   Federico Almerares
 17   Xherdan Shaqiri
 20   Behrang Safari
 21   Genséric Kusunga
 23   Massimo Colomba
 24   Cabral
 28   Beg Ferati

2010–11 Summer transfers

In

Out

Out on loan

Winter break transfers

In

Competitions

Overall
At the start of the season, Basel was entered into 3 competitions — the Swiss Super League, the Swiss Cup, and the UEFA Champions League. Upon elimination from the group stage of the Champions League, Basel dropped into the UEFA Europa League.

Results and fixtures
Legend

Kickoff times are in CET.

Pre- and mid-season friendlies

Winterbreak and mid-season friendlies

Swiss Super League

First half of season

Second half of season

League table

Swiss Cup

UEFA Champions League

Third qualifying round

Note 1: Played in Budapest at Szusza Ferenc Stadium as Debrecen's Stadion Oláh Gábor Út did not meet UEFA criteria.

Play-off round

Group stage / Group E

UEFA Europa League / knockout phase

Spartak Moscow won 4–3 on aggregate.

Statistics
Includes all competitive matches.

Last updated on 28 August

Top scorers

Top assistants

Discipline

References

Sources
 Rotblau: Jahrbuch Saison 2015/2016. Publisher: FC Basel Marketing AG. 
 Rotblau: Jahrbuch Saison 2017/2018. Publisher: FC Basel Marketing AG. 
 Die ersten 125 Jahre / 2018. Publisher: Josef Zindel im Friedrich Reinhardt Verlag, Basel. 
 Season 2010–11 at "Basler Fussballarchiv” homepage
 Switzerland 2010–11 at RSSSF

External links
 

2010-11
Basel
2010–11 UEFA Champions League participants seasons
2010-11